Espyville is an unincorporated community in North Shenango Township, Crawford County, Pennsylvania, United States.  Espyville is part of the Pymatuning Central census-designated place.

References 

DeLorme (2003). Pennsylvania Atlas & Gazetteer. Yarmouth Maine: DeLorme. .

Unincorporated communities in Crawford County, Pennsylvania
Unincorporated communities in Pennsylvania